Catriona Isobel Matthew  (née Lambert; born 25 August 1969) is a Scottish professional golfer who plays mainly on the US-based LPGA Tour and is also a member of the Ladies European Tour.

Amateur career
Catriona Lambert was born in Edinburgh, and grew up in North Berwick. She learned to play golf on the Children's Course and North Berwick West Links in the town. She had a successful junior and amateur career, becoming Scottish Girls champion in 1986 and Scottish Under-21 Stroke Play champion in 1988 and 1989. She captured the Scottish Amateur title in 1991, 1993 and 1994, and the British Amateur title in 1993. She is also a two-time winner of the St Rule Trophy played at St Andrews. She was a member of the 1990, 1992 and 1994 Great Britain & Ireland Curtis Cup teams. She graduated from the University of Stirling in 1992 having studied accountancy, this being one of a few British universities offering golf scholarships.

Professional career
Matthew qualified for the LPGA Tour by tying for fifth at the 1994 LPGA Final Qualifying Tournament to earn exempt status for the 1995 season. She soon established herself on the Tour, and her best seasons were 2001 and 2005, when she finished tenth on the money list.

Matthew also qualified for the Ladies European Tour in 1995 and plays several events on that tour each season. She won her maiden professional tournament at the Holden Women's Australian Open in 1996. She won the 1998 McDonald's WPGA Championship on the Ladies European Tour. She was a member of the 1998 Solheim Cup Team and first reserve for the 2000 matches held in her native Scotland. When Helen Alfredsson hurt her wrist she was called into the team but Alfredsson recovered and Matthew did not play. She was somewhat controversially left out of the 2002 Solheim Cup team but was a captain's pick for the 2003 team, gaining the Cup winning point. She was a captain's pick for the 2005 team as well. She qualified outright for the 2007, 2009 and 2011 Solheim Cup teams.

She teamed with Janice Moodie to represent Scotland at the 2005 and 2006 Women's World Cup of Golf. and was a member of the victorious International team captained by Annika Sörenstam in the inaugural Lexus Cup.

She won the 2007 Scandinavian TPC hosted by Annika.

In January 2009, she won the inaugural HSBC LPGA Brasil Cup 2009, an unofficial LPGA event with a field of 14 LPGA players and a Brazilian national amateur. Matthew was five months pregnant with her second child at the time of the victory.

On 2 August 2009 at Royal Lytham & St Annes, Matthew won the Ricoh Women's British Open with a final score of 3-under-par over second-place finisher Karrie Webb. It was her first win in a major tournament. The victory came 11 weeks after she gave birth to her second daughter, Sophie. She was the first player from Scotland to win a women's major golf tournament.

On 13 November 2011, Matthew won her fourth LPGA title at the Lorena Ochoa Invitational in Mexico.

At the 2013 LPGA Championship, Matthew finished runner-up after losing a sudden-death playoff against the world number one Inbee Park. Matthew and Park finished the tournament tied together at five-under-par, with Matthew coming from seven strokes behind Park at the start of the final round. In the playoff, they both parred the first two extra holes, but Matthew lost out on the third extra hole when Park made birdie.

In July 2016, Matthew was named as a vice-captain for the 2017 Solheim Cup but ended up playing in the match after an injury to Suzann Pettersen.

On 21 September 2017, Matthew was announced as captain for the 2019 Solheim Cup, which took place at Gleneagles.  Europe won the cup in 2019.

In October 2019, Matthew was announced as Solheim Cup captain for 2021. On 6 September 2021, Matthew led the European team to defeat the US at the Inverness Club, Toledo, Ohio.

Personal life
Matthew's husband Graeme is her caddy and on 18 December 2006 they had their first child, a daughter, Katie. Matthew gave birth to a second daughter named Sophie on 16 May 2009.

In July 2009, Matthew and her husband escaped a fire at the hotel they were staying in while she played in the Evian Masters. Graeme suffered burns to his feet and was unable to caddy for two rounds.

Matthew was appointed Member of the Order of the British Empire (MBE) in the 2010 New Year Honours and Officer of the Order of the British Empire (OBE) in the 2020 New Year Honours for services to golf.

Professional wins (11)

LPGA Tour wins (4)

LPGA Tour playoff record (1–2)

Ladies European Tour wins (6)

Other wins (2)

1 The Ricoh Women's British Open is co-sanctioned by the LPGA Tour and the Ladies European Tour.
Majors championships are shown in bold.

Major championships

Wins (1)

Results timeline
Results not in chronological order before 2019.

^ The Women's British Open replaced the du Maurier Classic as an LPGA major in 2001.
^^ The Evian Championship was added as a major in 2013

CUT = missed the half-way cut
NT = no tournament
T = tied

Summary

Most consecutive cuts made – 10 (2001 LPGA – 2003 U.S. Open)
Longest streak of top-10s – 2 (four times)

LPGA Tour career summary

 official through 2020 season

World ranking
Position in Women's World Golf Rankings at the end of each calendar year.

Team appearances
Amateur
European Lady Junior's Team Championship (representing Scotland): 1988
European Ladies' Team Championship (representing Scotland): 1989, 1991, 1993
Vagliano Trophy (representing Great Britain & Ireland): 1989 (winners), 1991 (winners), 1993 (winners)
Curtis Cup (representing Great Britain & Ireland): 1990, 1992 (winners), 1994 (tie, Cup retained)
Espirito Santo Trophy (representing Great Britain & Ireland): 1992
Commonwealth Trophy (representing Great Britain): 1991 (winners)

Professional
Solheim Cup (representing Europe): 1998, 2003 (winners), 2005, 2007, 2009, 2011 (winners), 2013 (winners), 2015, 2017, 2019 (non-playing captain, winners), 2021 (non-playing captain, winners)
Lexus Cup (representing International team): 2005 (winners), 2007
World Cup (representing Scotland): 2005, 2006, 2008
Handa Cup (representing World team): 2015
The Queens (representing Europe): 2015, 2016
European Championships (representing Great Britain): 2018

Solheim Cup record

References

External links

Scottish female golfers
LPGA Tour golfers
Ladies European Tour golfers
Winners of LPGA major golf championships
Winners of ladies' major amateur golf championships
Solheim Cup competitors for Europe
Olympic golfers of Great Britain
Golfers at the 2016 Summer Olympics
Officers of the Order of the British Empire
Alumni of the University of Stirling
People educated at North Berwick High School
Golfers from Edinburgh
People associated with East Lothian
1969 births
Living people